The Steel Rope (Italian: La corda d'acciaio) is a 1954 melodrama film directed by Carlo Borghesio and starring Brigitte Fossey and Virna Lisi.

Plot

Cast
 Brigitte Fossey as Marcella
 Fausto Tozzi as Filippo
 Xenia Valderi as Elsa  
 Virna Lisi as Stella
 Nando Bruno as Checco
 Olga Solbelli as Edvige 
 Rina Franchetti

External links

1954 films
1950s Italian-language films
Films directed by Carlo Borghesio
Italian drama films
1954 drama films
Melodrama films
Italian black-and-white films
French black-and-white films
French drama films
1950s Italian films
1950s French films